Moulins-sur-Allier station (French: Gare de Moulins-sur-Allier) is a railway station serving the town Moulins, Allier department, central France. It is situated on the Moret–Lyon railway, the Montluçon–Moulins railway and the Moulins–Mâcon railway. The station is served by long distance trains (Intercités) towards Paris, Nantes, Clermont-Ferrand and Lyon, and regional trains towards Clermont-Ferrand, Dijon, Nevers, Montchanin and Lyon.

References

External links
 

Railway stations in Allier